The GB3 Championship is a single seater motorsport series based in the United Kingdom. The championship is the UK's premier single-seater category, and is aimed at young racing drivers moving up from FIA Formula 4 championships or Karting. Having previously been known since 2013 as the BRDC Formula 4 Championship, the championship was renamed the BRDC British Formula 3 Championship with the backing of the FIA in March 2016. The championship was rebranded to GB3 Championship in August 2021.

History

On 23 March 2016, the FIA and MSA revealed to the FIA World Motor Sport Council that an agreement had been reached the day prior to rebrand the BRDC Formula 4 Championship in order to reflect the increased pace of the new car designed for the 2016 season, and to fill the void left after the British Formula 3 Championship folded in 2014.

The series will co-headline seven of eight rounds with the British GT Championship.

The BRDC British Formula Three Championship notably does not use a FIA Formula 3 car, instead using a car based on the Formula 4 specification that is elevated to the pace of F3 cars. The car is designed by Italian manufacturer Tatuus to the F3 safety regulations including side impact panels, front and rear carbon impact structures, wheel tethers and extractable seat. British engine and electronics manufacturer Cosworth provides the engine and related control electronics for the FA-016. The car also uses a unique Sadev limited slip differential.

The cars are around the same pace as the previous FIA F3 specification car used prior to the series folding in 2014.

The FIA have previously been stringent with assigning of national F3 status. The Euroformula Open Championship had to drop the F3 moniker due to it using an old specification Dallara F312 Formula 3 car and low specification engine that did not meet the standards set by the FIA's single-seater commission. The granting of the national F3 status to the Tatuus-Cosworth highlights the pace of the car in relation to the FIA's other formula specifications.

BRDC British F3 morphed out of the BRDC F4 category, which ran for three seasons before the new car was introduced.

The F4 name was operated by the 750 Motor Club before being awarded to MotorSport Vision. Under the BRDC F4 moniker, British driver Jake Hughes was the first champion of the series in 2013, driving for Lanan Racing. The championship top three of Hughes, vice-champion Seb Morris and Charlie Robertson were all finalists in that year's McLaren Autosport BRDC Award.

In 2014, George Russell was crowned champion following a dramatic victory in the season finale at Snetterton. Russell beat his Lanan Racing teammate Arjun Maini by just three points and went on to win the 2014 McLaren Autosport BRDC Award later in the year.

Will Palmer was crowned the 2015, champion after a dominant campaign in which he took 12 victories from the 24 races. His HHC Motorsport teammate Harri Newey finished as runner-up, with Palmer subsequently named as the winner of the McLaren Autosport BRDC Award in December.

In the first season of BRDC British F3, Matheus Leist secured the championship in the final weekend of the season, while British driver Lando Norris won three races and was named the winner of the 2016 McLaren Autosport BRDC Award in December.

Enaam Ahmed claimed the title after a dominant campaign in 2017 which saw him win a total of 13 races.

Linus Lundqvist won the championship in 2018, which also saw him claim a prize drive at the 2019 24 Hours of Daytona. Subsequent champions were Clement Novalak and Kaylen Frederick, both driving for Carlin.

In August 2021 the series was renamed as GB3 Championship; British racing driver Zak O'Sullivan was the first to win the title under the new name. The following month, MSV announced a new support series would be launched with the GB4 Championship.

Shortly after the rebrand, the series announced a new car would be used for 2022, the Tatuus MSV-022, with performance and safety upgrades including the addition of the halo. The new car has proven to be around two to three seconds a lap quicker than its predecessor.

Chassis specifications

GB3 Championship Car

The Tatuus MSV-022 car is a significantly more powerful car than Formula 4 machinery, with a more sophisticated aerodynamic package and increased downforce which elevates its pace to equivalent to European Formula Regional Series cars.

The car utilises a carbon-fibre Tatuus chassis equipped with the Halo and is powered by a two-litre normally aspirated 250bhp spec Mountune engine. The MSV-022 meets all the latest FIA Formula 3 safety regulations including side impact panels, front and rear carbon impact structures, wheel tethers and extractable seat.

An improved aerodynamic set-up includes a highly adjustable front-wing and two piece rear-wing, and an F1-style front splitter and rear diffuser, and underfloor aerodynamics.

It features a six-speed sequential gearbox with paddle shift provided by Sadev and fitted with a limited-slip differential, unique to GB3.

Pirelli provides both dry and wet tyres to the GB3 Championship.

The braking system is supplied by AP Racing and features 4-piston front calipers and floating, grooved and ventilated discs with 2-piston rear caliper and fixed vented rear disc.

Twin wishbone suspension with two-way adjustable dampers and adjustable front and rear anti-roll bars will provide drivers with plenty of scope for set-up changes.

Points system

Points are awarded to all finishing drivers in each race, except the reverse grid race two, using the following system in 2013:

Points are awarded to all finishing drivers in each race, using the following system since 2014:

In the reverse grid races, an extra point is awarded per position gained compared to each drivers' starting position.

Champions

Operating under 750 Motor Club
All champions were British-registered.

BRDC Formula 4 Championship

BRDC British Formula 3 Championship

GB3 Championship

Notes

References

External links
 

 
Auto racing series in the United Kingdom
2006 establishments in the United Kingdom
Recurring sporting events established in 2006